Sinéad Desmond (born 11 September 1974) is an Irish journalist and television presenter. Working in London for the majority of her career in print journalism, she was a writer and reporter for many major newspaper and magazine titles.  In 2007 she became the longest serving female anchor of Ireland AM, Ireland's most popular morning television show on TV3. She became a much loved household name in the ten years she presented the show. In November 2017 she resigned due to a gender pay gap dispute. Desmond has not spoken about this publicly except to say the matter is now a legal one. Desmond has also worked as a columnist for several publications, including The Observer, Marie Claire, Vogue and Sun.

Personal life
Desmond is a fluent speaker in French, German and Italian.

On 10 June 2008, she was rushed to hospital having suffered a brain haemorrhage on the set of Ireland AM. She made a full recovery and weeks later was released from hospital.

In September 2009, after suffering altitude sickness, she was rescued by a helicopter on Mont Blanc.

In 2014, she danced in the Breast Cancer Ireland's Strictly Against Breast Cancer Fundraiser.

References

1974 births
20th-century Irish people
21st-century Irish people
Living people
Ireland AM hosts
The Observer people
People educated at Holy Child Killiney